Darreh Badam-e Sofla (also Romanized as Darreh Bādām-e Soflá and Darreh Bādām Soflá; also known as Darreh Bādām-e Pā’īn) is a village in Pishkuh-e Mugui Rural District, in the Central District of Fereydunshahr County, Isfahan Province, Iran. At the 2006 census, its population was 116, in 18 families.

References 

Populated places in Fereydunshahr County